Paul Gutierrez is the Las Vegas Raiders Insider for Comcast SportsNet in San Francisco. He joined the network in 2010 and covers the Raiders for CSNBayArea.com and CSNCalifornia.com. Additionally, Gutierrez contributes to SportsNet Central, Chronicle Live, Raiders Postgame Live, Raiders Press Conference Live, as well as other NFL related programming.

Careers
Gutierrez spent five years with the Sacramento Bee (2005-2010) as a senior writer, where he covered the Oakland A’s and the San Francisco Giants. He also voted on the Associated Press Postseason Awards panel.  He has been a member of the Baseball Writers' Association of America since 2000, where he was chair of the Bay Area chapter and voting member of the Hall of Fame.  Gutierrez also worked for the Los Angeles Times (1999-2005), the Las Vegas Review-Journal (1998-1999), and Sports Illustrated (1995-1998).

Education
He received his B.A. in Communications from the University of Nevada, Las Vegas.

Personal life
Gutierrez was born in Barstow, California. He currently lives in Petaluma, California with his wife, Amy Gutierrez, who is a Comcast SportsNet San Francisco reporter, and their two children.

References

External links
 Paul Gutierrez's Blog Archive

American sports announcers
Living people
People from Barstow, California
University of Nevada, Las Vegas alumni
Year of birth missing (living people)